Eduardo Melchert (born 28 September 1961) is a Brazilian sailor. He competed in the men's 470 event at the 1992 Summer Olympics.

References

External links
 

1961 births
Living people
Brazilian male sailors (sport)
Olympic sailors of Brazil
Sailors at the 1992 Summer Olympics – 470
Place of birth missing (living people)